Ermont–Eaubonne is a railway station between Ermont and Eaubonne, in the department of Val-d'Oise, France. It is an interchange station for commuter traffic in the northwestern suburbs of Paris. It is situated on the railway from Paris to Pontoise, and branch lines towards Valmondois, Argenteuil and Saint-Ouen.

Lines serving this station
 RER Line C
 SNCF Ermont–Eaubonne–Persan Beaumont
 SNCF Gare du Nord (Banlieue)–Persan-Beaumont
 SNCF Gare du Nord (Banlieue)–Pontoise
 SNCF Gare du Nord (Banlieue)–Saint-Leu-la-forêt
 SNCF Gare du Nord (Banlieue)–Valmondois
 SNCF Gare Saint-Lazare (Banlieue)–Ermont–Eaubonne (Terminus)

See also
 List of stations of the Paris RER

External links

 

Réseau Express Régional stations
Railway stations in Val-d'Oise
Railway stations in France opened in 1846